Neophaeosphaeria is a genus of fungi in the family Phaeosphaeriaceae.

References

Phaeosphaeriaceae